The Unbelievable Truth may refer to:

 The Unbelievable Truth (radio show) a BBC radio panel game (started 2006)
 The Unbelievable Truth (TV series), a 2012 Australian television comedy series derived from  the radio show of the same name
 The Unbelievable Truth (film), a 1989 comedy-drama film
 Unbelievable Truth, a British rock band

See also

 
 Unbelievable (disambiguation)
 Truth (disambiguation)